Morris Jastrow Jr. (August 13, 1861 – June 22, 1921) was a Polish-born American  orientalist and librarian associated with the University of Pennsylvania.

Biography
He was born in Warsaw, Poland, and came to Philadelphia in 1866 when his father, Marcus Jastrow, a renowned Talmudic scholar,  accepted a position as Rabbi of Congregation Rodeph Shalom. He was educated in the schools of Philadelphia, and graduated from the University of Pennsylvania in 1881. His original intention was to become a rabbi. For this purpose, he carried on theological studies at the Jewish Seminary of Breslau in Germany while pursuing the study of Semitic languages at German universities. He traveled to Europe and studied at the University of Leipzig, where he received his Ph.D. in 1884. He then spent another year in the study of Semitic languages at the Sorbonne, the Collège de France and the École des Langues Orientales Levant Vivantes.

On his return to the United States in 1885, he was appointed assistant to his father in Philadelphia, which position he voluntarily resigned after one year. His farewell sermon, entitled "Jews and Judaism" was generally understood to be a personal repudiation of traditional Judaism. He went on to devote himself entirely to linguistic and archaeological studies. He gradually extended his field to include the history of religions. He joined the University of Pennsylvania in 1885 as an instructor of Semitic languages, and became professor of Semitic languages in 1891. In 1888, he became a librarian at the University of Pennsylvania, becoming librarian-in-chief in 1898.

He was president of the American Oriental Society 1914–15, and of the Society of Biblical Literature in 1916.  He died in Jenkintown, Pennsylvania, in 1921.

He contributed articles to, and was one of the editors of the scholarly Jewish Encyclopedia published 1901-1906 by the Jewish Publication Society; he was, as well, a contributor to the Encyclopaedia Biblica (1903), the Encyclopædia Britannica (11th edition), the New International Encyclopaedia and Webster's Dictionary.

He edited a fragment of the Babylonian Dibbarra Epic (1891); the Arabic text of the grammatical treatises of Abu Zakariyya Hayyug (1897); Selected Essays of James Darmesteter (with a memoir; translation of the essays from the original French by Helen Bachman Jastrow (Mrs. Morris Jastrow, Jr.), 1895); and a series of Handbooks on the History of Religion. A bibliography of his books, monographs and papers, covering the years 1885–1916, was compiled and published (for private circulation) by A. T. Clay and J. A. Montgomery.

Among his students was Dr. Pezavia O'Connell, the first African-American scholar to earn a PhD in Semitic languages.  In 1898, O'Connell wrote a dissertation under Jastrow's supervision at the University of Pennsylvania, entitled, Synonyms of the Unclean & the Clean in Hebrew.

Works

 
  Volume 2 was published in 1912. This work is an enlarged and entirely rewritten German edition of the English edition, together with a separate volume of illustrations bearing on the religion of the Babylonians and Assyrians (3 volumes altogether).
   (also published NYC: Charles Scribner's Sons)
 
 
 Babylonian-Assyrian Birth Omens and Their Cultural Significance (1914)
 The Civil Law of Babylonia and Assyria (1915)
 
 
 
 
 
 The Eastern Question and its Solution (1920)
 
 An Assyrian Law Code (1921) Ann Arbor: Journal of the American Oriental Society, 1921.

References

External links

1861 births
1921 deaths
American Assyriologists
American librarians
American orientalists
American people of Polish-Jewish descent
Jewish American writers
Leipzig University alumni
University of Pennsylvania alumni
University of Pennsylvania faculty
Assyriologists